The University of Central Lancashire (abbreviated UCLan) is a public university based in the city of Preston, Lancashire, England. It has its roots in The Institution For The Diffusion Of Useful Knowledge, founded in 1828. Previously known as Harris Art College, Preston Polytechnic and Lancashire Polytechnic. in 1992 it was granted university status by the Privy Council. The university is the 19th largest in the UK in terms of student numbers.

History

The Institution for the Diffusion of Knowledge was founded in 1828 by Joseph Livesey's Temperance Society. The society was born from a pledge made by seven Preston working men (whose names can be seen on a plaque in the university's library) to never again consume alcohol.

The institute was housed in a classical-revivalist building on Cannon Street, before eventually expanding under the endowment of a local lawyer, Edmund Robert Harris, who died in 1877. The expansion brought with it several new buildings and houses in the nearby Regent Street were purchased and demolished as a consequence. The institute became a regional centre for the arts and sciences.

As part of Queen Victoria's Diamond Jubilee celebrations in 1897, the institute's trustees paid the Victorian/Edwardian architect Henry Cheers to design the "Victoria Jubilee Technical School" (later known as the Harris Institute and now known as the Harris Building), to be built on Corporation Street. The foundation stone was laid in July 1895.  Its goal was to provide local youths with a technical education in all areas. The building was progressive for the period, being powered entirely by electricity.

The institute existed in this state until 1932, when it changed its name to become the Harris Art College. It underwent further expansion and in 1952, and became the Harris College. In 1973, this became Preston Polytechnic, then the Lancashire Polytechnic in 1984. In 1992, full university status was awarded, and the University of Central Lancashire came into existence. The first chancellor of the university was Sir Francis Kennedy, and he was succeeded in 2001 by Sir Richard Evans. In 2016, Ranvir Singh became the new chancellor of the university.

The journalism division, now part of the School of Journalism and Media, is one of the oldest in the country, opening as part of the Harris College in 1962. In 1991, it became one of the first to teach journalism undergraduate degrees, with a strong emphasis on practical work.

In 2013, the School of Dentistry and the School of Postgraduate Medical and Dental Education merged to create the School of Medicine and Dentistry.

The university sponsored the now-defunct Wigan UTC, a university technical college which opened in September 2013.

Campus

The university is on an urban campus in Preston, with sites in Burnley and in Westlakes, West Cumbria (for nuclear and energy related research programmes). A campus in Cyprus opened in October 2012.

Livesey House is named after temperance activist Joseph Livesey.

The university opened the new JB Firth building in September 2011, at a cost of £12.5m. It houses the School of Forensic and Applied Sciences, which includes subjects such as chemistry and forensic science. The new building has a 4,000 m2 teaching area, which includes six laboratories: two for chemistry undergraduate teaching, one for chemistry research, one analytical laboratory and two fire laboratories. The building was named after James Brierly Firth, a founder of forensic science in Britain.

The Sir Tom Finney Sports Centre opened, replacing the Foster Sports Centre, in 2011. It is a purpose-built indoor facility on the main campus and offers Students' Union sports clubs, instructor-led classes and individual training. Sports membership (including gym) is free for most students and discounted for staff.

Other key facilities include a £15m Media Factory with facilities for digital media and performing arts students, and a 'business incubator'. The £5.3 million Allen Building incorporates facilities for students in the School of Medicine and Dentistry.

The university underwent a £200 million expansion programme, with several new buildings at the Preston main campus: 

 Social Spaces (open as of 2018). Two new social spaces, one located between the Harrington and Greenbank buildings and the other at the Foster building. These social spaces contain a range of relaxation space for students including; pool tables, table tennis tables and a bean bag area.
 Engineering Innovation Centre (opened September 2019). A £32 million purpose built teaching and exhibition space.  The building contains several specialist labs as well as four flight simulators. It provides an integrated space for teaching, research and direct links with industry. The EIC secured £10.5 million worth of funding via the Lancashire Enterprise Partnerships’ Growth Deal with the Government. The new facility has also received £5.8 million from the European Regional Development Fund (ERDF) and £5 million from HEFCE's STEM Capital Fund.
 Oasis: Faith and Spirituality Centre (open as of May 2018). Consisting of multiple faith rooms, counselling and event space as well as roof terrace, this multi faith centre is to replace the existing one located on St. Peter's Court.
 Student Centre and New Square (opened in 2021). This £57 million project was built with the purpose of creating a new campus reception building, housing several student services, meeting rooms, office space, event venues and a rooftop garden. A new square was also built in front of the student centre. Both the new square and student centre were constructed partially on the existing Adelphi roundabout and on the land once occupied by the Fylde building.

Cyprus

UCLan Cyprus is a branch campus of the University of Central Lancashire situated in Pyla, Larnaka. The campus opened in 2012 and is licensed and registered as a university in Cyprus. It is the only private British university in Cyprus. It accepts international students.

UCLan Cyprus is the first University in Cyprus that has a Moot Court for use by the School of Law students.

UCLan Cyprus offers bachelor's degrees in business administration, advertising and marketing communications, accounting and finance, hospitality and tourism management, computing, mathematics, English language studies, law, web design and development, sport and exercise science and psychology.

It offers master's degrees in business administration, business management, marketing management, education leadership, teaching English to speakers of other languages (TESOL) with applied linguistics, financial and commercial law, computing, cybersecurity, data analytics, sport & exercise science and forensic psychology.

Academic profile

The university has students and researchers from over 100 countries and partnerships with 125 international institutions. It has a base in China's Shenzhen Virtual University Park, conducting collaborative research with some of China's leading universities into nanotechnology with applications in drug delivery, water purification and fire toxicity.

Within the School of Language and Global Studies, staff speak 30 languages and represent 22 nationalities.

UCLan has 98 professors, over 600 research or knowledge transfer-active members of staff, and 763 research students. There are 246 Honorary Fellows of the university.

The university has the following schools:

 Centre for Collaborative Learning
 Arts and Media
 Business
 Community Health and Midwifery
 Dentistry
 Engineering
 Humanities, Language and Global Studies
 Justice
 Management
 Medicine
 Natural Sciences
 Nursing
 Pharmacy and Biomedical Sciences
 Psychology and Computing
 Social Work, Care and Community
 Sport and Health Sciences
 Myerscough College (Associate School)

International developments

UCLan enrolls students from over 100 countries and has partnerships with 125 international institutions located across the world.
Each year over 2,000 international students study at the university's Preston Campus.

UCLan was the first modern university in the UK to be included in the Quacquarelli Symonds (QS) World University Rankings.
In 2013 QS awarded UCLan the full five stars for its approach to ‘Internationalisation’ with a proven track record for specialising in all aspects of international educational provision.

UCLan has over 3,000 students enrolled offshore, across a diverse range of countries including China, Greece, India, Mauritius, Singapore and the United States.

In 2012 the university opened UCLan Cyprus, a €53 million branch campus in Larnaka, Cyprus. It is the only private British university in Cyprus.

In 2013, following receipt of Chinese Ministry of Education approval and together with its partner Hebei University (HBU), the UCLan established the ‘Hebei/UCLan School of Media, Communication and Creative Industries’.

Initially the joint School will have non-independent status, meaning that although it will be a separate entity from HBU it will be wholly owned by it. The School will have 800 students, recruiting 200 per year for the four-year duration of the programmes. The intention is to grow to 1,600 students and then to focus on a broader range of subjects, targeting science in the second wave. When successfully operating at the expanded level, the School will apply for independent campus status.

Rankings

UCLan is in the top 3.7% of universities worldwide according to The Centre for World University Rankings 2016 (CWUR).

UCLan is in the top 800 universities globally according to the  Times Higher Education World University Rankings.

Film production
UCLAN is the only university in the UK to run a feature film module. Results of this course include The Collaborators (2015), Audax (2014), The Wedding (2013), Wraith (2012) and Needle In The Hay (2011).

Research 
Research activity at UCLan includes working with NASA on solar dynamics, with the Department of Health on stroke research, with industry on digital media projects and collaboration with the Football Association, Professional Golfers Association and International Olympic Committee on sport and exercise science research.

Undergraduate research
UCLan has established one of the UK's largest paid undergraduate research internship schemes.

Since the scheme launched in 2008, nearly 450 interns have worked directly alongside UCLan researchers on projects as diverse as digital publishing, wind power analysis, facial composite development and smart bandage exploration.

Autonomous systems research 
In 2012, UCLAN announced a partnership with the BAE Systems, and four other north-western universities (Liverpool, Salford, Lancaster and Manchester) in order to work on the Gamma Programme which aims to develop "autonomous systems". According to the University of Liverpool when referring to the programme, "autonomous systems are technology based solutions that replace humans in tasks that are mundane, dangerous and dirty, or detailed and precise, across sectors, including aerospace, nuclear, automotive and petrochemicals".

Student life

Students' Union

The nightclub and live music venue at the Students' Union, '53 Degrees', has two floors with a bar on each and occasionally hosts musical performers. Across two rooms, total capacities are 1,100 & 350 for club nights and 1,400 and 350 for all live gigs. The adjoining bar, 'Source', is open seven days a week during term times. '53 Degrees' is no longer owned by the Students' Union however Freshers' Week events are still run in the venue.

Sports
There are over 35 sports clubs run by the students’ union. Many have block bookings at the Sir Tom Finney Sports Centre and UCLan Sports Arena  in term-time for training and matches. The sports clubs participate in British Universities and Colleges Sport competitions and have home and away fixtures.

The university outdoor sport facilities can be found at UCLan Sports Arena (USA) which is located two miles away and was opened in 2000 by The Princess Royal. The £12 million arena provides facilities for rugby league, rugby union, football (five grass pitches), hockey (two floodlit all-weather pitches), netball, tennis (four floodlit courts), and cycling ( circuit), as well as an eight-lane athletics area, equipped for school, club, and county competitions.

The university's Motor Sports Engineering and Operations students run a motor racing team, UCLAN Racing.

Media
The Pulse is the student newspaper. It is six times a year, and began in 1985 as the Ribble Echo and then was named Pluto until June 2016. It is now printed in tabloid format with colour photography. The newspaper published its first edition on 12 September 2016.

Pulse Radio is the student radio station which is located on the ground floor of the Students' Union building. It was founded in 1999 as Frequency Radio and is currently broadcasting during term time. The new radio station started broadcasting on 12 September 2016.

Pulse Radio is the student television station which is located on the ground floor of the Students' Union building. The station covers news, entertainment, and documentaries.

Notable people

Alumni

 Estelle Asmodelle, Australian model and activist
 Ekin-Su Cülcüloğlu, Turkish actress, singer, model and television personality
 Waqar Azmi, EU Ambassador and former Chief Diversity Adviser to the Prime Minister, Cabinet Office
 Jim Bamber, illustrator for Autosport (Preston College of Art)
 Polly Billington, journalist and special adviser to Ed Miliband
 Isioma Daniel, journalist
 Victoria Derbyshire, broadcaster on BBC Radio Five Live
 Reni Eddo-Lodge, journalist and author of Why I’m No Longer Talking to White People About Race
 Mary Fitzpatrick, photographer, visual artist Liverpool Art Prize
 Richard Frediani, Editor of BBC Breakfast
 Andy Goldsworthy, visual artist
 Nina Hossain, ITV News broadcaster
 Simon Kelner, former editor of The Independent
 Sarah Ann Kennedy, British voice actress
 Carl Lygo, Vice-Chancellor, BPP University
 Lee Mavers, founding member of Liverpool band The La's
 Adam McClean, BBC Breakfast and BBC News journalist
 Paul Nuttall, UKIP MEP
 Ian Payne, Sky sports broadcaster
 Brent Sadler, CNN correspondent
 Andrew Shie, Assistant Bishop of the Anglican Diocese of Kuching (Sarawak and Brunei Darussalam), first Anglican Bishop from Brunei
Gemma Hallett, International Rugby Player and Entrepreneur
 Ranvir Singh, BBC Radio Five Live and television presenter
 Donald Stokes, Baron Stokes, industrialist and life peer
 Mike Sutton, originator of the Market Reduction Approach
 Bryan Talbot, award-winning comic book artist and writer
 Mark Tattersall, television presenter Granada Reports
 Don Warrington, actor
 William Watt, 2010 Digital Journalist of the Year
 Kerry Wilkinson, UK number one bestselling author
Angela Wakefield British fine artist

Academics

 Dame Susan Bailey, Professor of Child Mental Health since 2004
 Warwick Fox, Emeritus Professor of Philosophy
 Duncan Glen, former lecturer in graphic design
 Stanley Henig, former head of the Department of Politics and European Studies
 Lubaina Himid, Professor of Contemporary Art, 2017 Turner Prize winner
 Christine King, former head of the School of Historical and Critical Studies and Dean of the Faculty of Arts
 Ewa Mazierska, Professor in Contemporary Cinema since 2008
 Ewan McKendrick, former lecturer in law
 David Andrew Phoenix, Deputy Vice-Chancellor from 2008 to 2013 
 Rex Pope, former head of the School of Historical and Critical Studies 
 Michael Thomas, Professor of Higher Education and Online Learning
 John K. Walton, former professor of social history
 Laurence Williams, Professor of Nuclear Safety and Regulation from 2010 to 2014

See also
 Armorial of UK universities
 List of universities in the UK
 Post-1992 universities

References

External links

 University of Central Lancashire website
 UCLan Students' Union website

 
Buildings and structures in Preston
Education in Preston
Educational institutions established in 1828
1828 establishments in England
Central Lancashire
Central Lancashire